Centre sportif des FAR, is based in the city of Salé, adjoining the city of Rabat, This is the sports centre of the club of ASFAR.

The construction of the sports center, covering a total area of 40 hectares, was entrusted to Cater, and completed in 1999. It was recently built by the ASFAR Football Academy in north of the Sports Center, which includes training courses and a group of schools.

Description

Sport centre
The sports center of ASFAR extends over an area of 40 hectares, and is a comprehensive sports center for many sports. It includes a main Olympic stadium for football in natural grass, with a side amphitheater with a capacity of 600 seats, a warehouse and a dispensary, another stadium with natural grass with FIFA standards, a rectangular area for training also with natural grass, and then an administrative unit with a club museum, a hall and a cafe for the first team. The north of the center was dedicated to the ASFAR Football Academy

There is a section called the sports group for collective games in the form of tents and includes a group of sports facilities from a large covered multi-sport hall for volleyball, basketball and handball branches with a capacity of 644 seats, two Olympic swimming pools, a boxing hall, two gymnastics and wrestling halls, a taekwondo hall and another for judo, and then a strengthening hall Muscles, a tennis court with a dirt floor, a mosque, a garage, and a section of residence for a group of residences.

The sports center also has a "sports medical center" that has a heart detection unit with advanced technologies. The medical center also includes a traditional radiology and ultrasound unit, a dental surgery unit, a functional rehabilitation unit, a hydrotherapy unit (Jacuzzi and sauna), and a hall dedicated to medical dressage. And physiotherapy room, massage room, electrophoresis room and recovery room. With a medical team consisting of six sports doctors, a dentist and physiotherapists in addition to qualified trainers.

ASFAR Football Academy 
ASFAR Football Academy, is a training center for football players and also includes handball and basketball players. The area of the academy is divided into two parts, with a total area of 25 hectares, parallel to the sports center of FAR in the north. It includes dozens of players who benefit from a study and sports program starting from 6 years. This academy has:
A modern stadium with high quality artificial grass, with a side stand with a warehouse, sports store and a visitor's canteen, which hosts official matches for all age groups of football.
Modern high quality artificial turf pitch with racetrack, side amphitheater with warehouse and modern muscle building hall.
Two modern pitches made of high quality artificial turf, medium in size.
Two courts for handball and basketball.
The ASFAR Group of Schools, comprising 12 classrooms equipped with audio-visual equipment.
Reading room, seminar room and lecture hall that can accommodate more than 200 people.
A hotel unit for players' accommodation with a capacity of 250 beds, and a restaurant with a private kitchen.
A clinic with modern qualifications for treatment and rehabilitation and a private ambulance.
Unit for administrative and technical frameworks.
Two private car parks.
 
In addition, ASFAR Club owns a group of other football schools in several neighborhoods of the capital, Rabat, especially in the neighborhood of Yacoub Al-Mansour, Al-Najah and the Hilton Forest in the center of the capital, and then the extension of the Prince Moulay Abdellah Stadium.

Administration

Events
 ASFAR Football Academy hosted the matches of the men's football teams in the 2019 African Games , which was held in Morocco.

References

External links
 Official club website
 Centre sportif des FAR at Soccerway

Football venues in Morocco
Rabat
Salé
Sport in Rabat
Sport in Salé
Sports venues in Morocco
Athletics (track and field) venues in Morocco
ASFAR
S
AS FAR (football)